Kooperatsiya Ice Piedmont is an ice piedmont at the southwestern side of Yermak Point on the west shore of Rennick Bay, Antarctica. This area was photographed in 1958 by the 3rd Soviet Antarctic Expedition which gave the name "Zaliv Kooperatsiya" to the western portion of Rennick Bay, but the Advisory Committee on Antarctic Names has retained the prior name Rennick Bay. For the sake of historical continuity, the name Kooperatsiya Ice Piedmont has been approved; it is named after the Kooperatsiya, the expedition ship used by the Soviet expedition in 1958.

References

Ice piedmonts of Antarctica
Landforms of Victoria Land
Pennell Coast